William Dickie Niven (26 April 1879 – 26 February 1965), of Fyvie, Aberdeenshire, was a Scottish academic.

Family
Niven was the son of Charles Niven and Jane M. Mackay. In 1908, he married Isabella Cumming and they had two daughters.

Education
He was educated at Fyvie Public School and Gordon's College, Aberdeen. Niven was educated at the University of Aberdeen, then at Berlin and Halle. He graduated with an MA from Aberdeen in 1900.

Career
He was a church minister from 1907 to 1927. Niven was Professor of New Testament Language and Literature from 1935 to 1946. He was professor of Ecclesiastical History from 1946 until 1949, both at Trinity College, Glasgow. He was an army chaplain during World War I. He was awarded the Lumsden and Sachs Fellowship and the Croom Robertson Fellowship. He retired in 1949.

Publications
The conflicts of the early church
John Knox and the Scottish Reformation
Reformation principles after four centuries : the thirty-fifth series of Croall lectures
The professor as preacher, sermons by Scottish theological professors
Leaders of the ancient Church. V, Cyprian of Carthage
National contributions to biblical science : XV. The contribution of Great Britain to church history. II

References

External links
William Dickie Niven on WorldCat

1879 births
1965 deaths
Alumni of the University of Aberdeen
Humboldt University of Berlin alumni
University of Halle alumni
Scottish scholars and academics
People from Aberdeenshire
People educated at Robert Gordon's College
Academics of the University of Glasgow
Historians of Christianity
British historians of religion